Trifolium amoenum, known by the common names showy Indian clover and two-fork clover, is endemic to California, and is an endangered annual herb that subsists in grassland areas of the San Francisco Bay Area and the northern California Coast Ranges.

Description
This wildflower has an erect growth habit and is typically found on heavy soils at elevations less than 100 meters. The flower head is somewhat spherical with a diameter of about 2.5 centimeters.  The petals are purple gradating to white tips.

History and conservation
Edward Lee Greene collected the first recorded specimen of this plant in 1890 in Vacaville, California (in Solano County).  The historical range of Trifolium amoenum was from the western extreme of the Sacramento Valley in Solano County west and north to Marin and Sonoma Counties, where many sites were presumed extirpated by urban and agricultural development.
  
From further expansion of the human population, Trifolium amoenum had become a rare species by the mid 1900s.  Through the latter 1900s the number of distinct populations dwindled to about 20 in number, from pressure of an expanding human population and urban development.

Rediscovery
By 1993 Trifolium amoenum was thought to be extinct, after the population in Vacaville, California depleted, but was rediscovered by Peter Connors in the form of a single plant on a site in western Sonoma County.  The seeds from this single plant organism were used to grow more specimens.

The Sonoma County location has been developed and any plants remaining there have been extirpated. Presently there is only a single extant population, subsequently discovered in 1996 in northern Marin County, which numbers approximately 200 plants.

Trifolium amoenum became a federally listed endangered species in 1997.  Recent conservation research on Trifolium amoenum has been conducted by the Bodega Marine Laboratory.

See also
Americano Creek
Vernal pool
California native plants

References

External links
Calflora Database: Trifolium amoenum (Showy indian clover)
Jepson Manual eFlora (TJM2) treatment of Trifolium amoenum
California Native Plant Link Exchange species summary for Trifolium amoenum
UC CalPhotos gallery:  Trifolium amoenum

amoenum
Endemic flora of California
Natural history of the California chaparral and woodlands
Natural history of the California Coast Ranges
Natural history of Marin County, California
Natural history of Sonoma County, California
Endemic flora of the San Francisco Bay Area